David A. Kofke is an American chemical engineer, currently SUNY Distinguished Professor at State University of New York. He is a Fellow of American Institute of Chemical Engineers.

References

Year of birth missing (living people)
Living people
State University of New York faculty
American chemical engineers
Fellows of the American Institute of Chemical Engineers